Hakkı Sözen (born 1 February 1950) is a Turkish boxer. He competed in the men's welterweight event at the 1972 Summer Olympics. At the 1972 Summer Olympics, he lost to Alfonso Fernández of Spain.

References

1950 births
Living people
Turkish male boxers
Olympic boxers of Turkey
Boxers at the 1972 Summer Olympics
Place of birth missing (living people)
Welterweight boxers